Chandimanthu Rodrigo (born 7 September 1990) is a Sri Lankan cricketer. He made his List A debut for Anuradhaura District in the 2016–17 Districts One Day Tournament on 22 March 2017. He made his first-class debut for Bloomfield Cricket and Athletic Club in the 2017–18 Premier League Tournament on 8 December 2017.

References

External links
 

1990 births
Living people
Sri Lankan cricketers
Anuradhaura District cricketers
Bloomfield Cricket and Athletic Club cricketers